Petr Vondráček (born 18 May 1977, in Czechoslovakia) is a heavyweight kickboxer. He is a former WKA World Champion.

Biography
Vondráček began martial arts at the age of 14. At the instigation of his mother, he entered a school of Shotokan Karate. Then he went to Kickboxing-Full Contact training. In amateur kickboxing, he won many battles. He later became five-time champion of the Czech Republic, European Champion and World Champion in Full Contact.

Career

Kickboxing 
In 1999, he became vice World Kickboxing Association (WKA) World Champion, he met another Czech Dan Waciakowski but lost on points in this fight. Vondráček was chosen to be part of the eight fighters K-1 tournament taking place in Prague but due to a foot injury, could not take part.

In 2002, he was invited to Italy to participate in the qualifying tournament for the K-1. He made a sensational performance, winning his three fights by knockout in the tournament. This performance earned him the attention of the Japanese organizers and participated in several prestigious K-1 Grand Prix. At a good time, a sad chapter in his career occurred, Petr Vondracek spent several months in prison. On his return he never found his true level and remained long without a coach. Since 2004 he has struggled to return to form.

He beat Radu Spinghel on November 10, 2012 in Craiova, Romania in a non-tournament at the SuperKombat World Grand Prix 2012 Final Elimination.

Lethwei 
On December 14, 2019, Vondráček faced Slovak MMA fighter Samuel "Pirát" Krištofič under Lethwei rules in Bratislava's Eurovia arena. The match was declared a draw under traditional KO to win rules. His opponent Krištofič broke both his hands during the match.

Titles
 2018 WASO K-1 World Champion Title +100 kg
 2017 WKN International Super Heavyweight Champion +96.6 kg.
 2016 WAKO Pro World K-1 Super Heavyweight Champion +94,1 kg.
 2014 WAKO Pro World K-1 Super Heavyweight Champion +94,2 kg.
 2002 K-1 World Grand Prix Preliminary Italy
 2000 W.K.A. World Champion from Czech Republic
 2000 Czech Open International Kickboxing Tournament Champion
 1999 W.K.A. Vice-World Champion in Full Contact from Beirut, Lebanon
 1996 Vienna Open International Kickboxing Tournament Champion
 5 times Czech Republic Champion

Kickboxing record

|-
|-  bgcolor="#FFBBBB"
| 2019-03-29 || Loss|| align=left| Daniel Ghiță || Colosseum Tournament 11 || Bucharest, Romania || KO (left hook) || 1 || 2:22
|-
|-  bgcolor="#CCFFCC"
| 2018-12-29 || Win ||align=left| Victor Mihai || Noc mistru 13 || Prague, Czech Republic || TKO || 2 ||
|-
! style=background:white colspan=9 |
|-
|-  bgcolor="#FFBBBB"
| 2018-04-05 || Loss ||align=left| Ondřej Hutník || Heroes Gate 20 || Prague, Czech Republic || Decision || 3 || 3:00
|-
! style=background:white colspan=9 |
|-
|-  bgcolor="#FFBBBB"
| 2018-03-16 || Loss ||align=left| Ivan Bartek || Simply the Best 18 || Slovakia || Decision || 3 || 3:00
|-
|-  bgcolor="#CCFFCC"
| 2017-11-11 || Win ||align=left| Jürgen Batista || Night of Warriors 2017 || Liberec, Czech Republic || TKO || 2||
|-
|-  bgcolor="#CCFFCC"
| 2017-07-27 || Win ||align=left| Neil Aquino || Yangames Fight Night 2017 || Prague, Czech Republic || TKO || 2||
|-
! style=background:white colspan=9 |
|-
|-  bgcolor="#CCFFCC"
| 2017-04-29 || Win ||align=left| Wieslaw Kwasniewski || Simply the Best 14 Prague|| Prague, Czech Republic || KO || 1 || 
|-
|-  bgcolor="#CCFFCC"
| 2016-07-28 || Win ||align=left| Sasa Polugic || Yangame´s Fight Night 2016 || Czech Republic || Decision (Split) || 5 || 3:00
|-
! style=background:white colspan=9 |
|-
|-  bgcolor="#FFBBBB"
| 2015-05-23 || Loss ||align=left| Nicolas Wamba || Simply the Best 4 || Usti nad Labem, Czech Republic || Decision || 3 || 3:00
|-
! style=background:white colspan=9 |
|-
|-  bgcolor="#FFBBBB"
| 2014-11-15 || Loss ||align=left| Stavros Grigorakakis || MS WKF K1  || Prague, Czech Republic || KO (Left Hook) || 3 || 
|-
! style=background:white colspan=9 |
|-
|-  bgcolor="#CCFFCC"
| 2014-07-31 || Win ||align=left| Nicolas Vermont || Yangame's Fight Night || Prague, Czech Republic || TKO (Right High Kick) || 2 || 
|-
! style=background:white colspan=9 |
|-
|-  bgcolor="#CCFFCC"
| 2013-12-12 || Win ||align=left| Geatan Sautron || Noc Válečníků 7 || Kladno, Czech Republic || KO (right overhand) || 1 || 
|-  bgcolor="#CCFFCC"
| 2012-11-10 || Win ||align=left| Radu Spinghel || SuperKombat World Grand Prix 2012 Final Elimination, Super Fight || Craiova, Romania || Decision (Unanimous) || 3 || 3:00
|-  bgcolor="#FFBBBB"
| 2011-10-22 || Loss ||align=left| Pacome Assi || Fight Code: Rhinos Series, Quarter Finals || Moscow, Russia || Decision (Split) || 3 || 3:00
|-  bgcolor="#CCFFCC"
| 2011-08-13 || Win ||align=left| Vjekoslav Bajic || Fight Code: Rhinos Series, Final 16 (Part 3) || Debrecen, Hungary || Decision (Unanimous) || 3 || 3:00
|-  bgcolor="#FFBBBB"
| 2011-05-28 || Loss ||align=left| Besim Kabashi || Steko's Fight Night || Munich, Germany || TKO (Referee Stoppage) || 4 || 1:27
|-
! style=background:white colspan=9 |
|-
|-  bgcolor="#FFBBBB"
| 2010-06-04 || Loss ||align=left| Freddy Kemayo || Ring of Honor || Nitra, Slovakia || TKO (Cut) || 1 || 
|-  bgcolor="#FFBBBB"
| 2009-10-24 || Loss ||align=left| Mihăiţă Golescu || K-1 ColliZion 2009 Final Elimination || Arad, Romania || Decision (Unanimous) || 3 || 3:00
|-  bgcolor="#FFBBBB"
| 2009-07-03 || Loss ||align=left| Dževad Poturak || K-1 ColliZion 2009 Sarajevo || Sarajevo, Bosnia and Herzegovina || Decision (Unanimous) || 3 || 3:00
|-  bgcolor="#FFBBBB"
| 2009-05-16 || Loss ||align=left| Sebastian Ciobanu || K-1 ColliZion 2009 Mlada Boleslav || Mlada Boleslav, Czech Republic || Decision (Unanimous) || 3 || 3:00
|-  bgcolor="#CCFFCC"
| 2008-12-20 || Win ||align=left| Reamon Welboren || K-1 Fighting Network Prague 2008 || Prague, Czech Republic || Decision (Unanimous) || 3 || 3:00
|-
|-  bgcolor="#FFBBBB"
| 2008-11-06 || Loss ||align=left| Sebastian Ciobanu || Local Kombat 31 || Buzău, Romania || Decision || 3 || 3:00
|-  bgcolor="#FFBBBB"
| 2008-04-13 || Loss ||align=left| Mitsugu Noda || K-1 World Grand Prix 2008 in Yokohama || Yokohama, Japan || KO (Punch Rush)  || 2 || 2:43
|-
|-  bgcolor="#FFBBBB"
| 2008-02-09 || Loss ||align=left| Attila Karacs || K-1 World GP 2008 in Budapest || Budapest, Hungary || KO (Right hook) || 3 || 1:21
|-  bgcolor="#FFBBBB"
| 2007-11-08 || Loss ||align=left| Ariel Mastov || K-1 World GP 2007 in Las Vegas || Las Vegas, Nevada, USA || KO (Spinning heel kick) || 3 || 1:52
|-
|-  bgcolor="#CCFFCC"
| 2007-06-15 || Win ||align=left| Ciprian Sora || Local Kombat 26 || Iaşi, Romania || KO || 1 ||
|-
|-  bgcolor="#FFBBBB"
| 2007-05-04 || Loss ||align=left| Adnan Redžović || K-1 Fighting Network Romania 2007, Quarter Final || Bucharest, Romania || Decision (Unanimous) || 3 || 3:00
|-
|-  bgcolor="#CCFFCC"
| 2007-03-02 || Win ||align=left| Ciprian Sora || Local Kombat 25 "Bătaie la poarta Ardealului" || Sibiu, Romania || KO || 1 ||
|-
|-  bgcolor="#FFBBBB"
| 2006-12-16 || Loss ||align=left| Humberto Evora || K-1 Fighting Network Prague Round '07, Quarter Final || Prague, Czech Republic || TKO || 2 ||
|-  bgcolor="#FFBBBB"
| 2006-05-13 || Loss ||align=left| Alexey Ignashov || K-1 World Grand Prix 2006 in Amsterdam, Quarter Final || Amsterdam, Netherlands || KO (Right Cross) || 2 || 2:08
|-  bgcolor="#CCFFCC"
| 2006-04-08 || Win ||align=left| Pelé Reid || K-1 Italy Oktagon 2006 || Milan, Italy || Decision || 3 || 3:00
|-
|-  bgcolor="#FFBBBB"
| 2005-06-25 || Loss ||align=left| James Phillips || The Fight Club Riccione 4-men tournament || Riccione, Italy || TKO (Doctor stoppage) || 2 || 2:16
|-  bgcolor="#FFBBBB"
| 2005-05-27 || Loss ||align=left| Semmy Schilt || K-1 World Grand Prix 2005 in Paris, Quarter Final || Paris, France || KO || 2 || 2:42
|-  bgcolor="#FFBBBB"
| 2004-06-06 || Loss ||align=left| Carter Williams || K-1 World Grand Prix 2004 in Nagoya || Nagoya, Japan || TKO || 2 || 1:57
|-  bgcolor="#FFBBBB"
| 2004-03-14 || Loss ||align=left| Tatsufumi Tomihira || K-1 Beast 2004 in Niigata || Niigata, Japan || Decision (Unanimous) || 3 || 3:00
|-  bgcolor="#CCFFCC"
| 2004-02-15 || Win ||align=left| Nobu Hayashi || K-1 Burning 2004 || Okinawa, Japan || KO || 1 || 1:35
|-
|-  bgcolor="#CCFFCC"
| 2002-09-22 || Win ||align=left| Great Kusatsu || K-1 Andy Spirits Japan GP 2002 Final || Osaka, Japan || KO (Kick) || 2 || 1:32
|-
|-  bgcolor="#FFBBBB"
| 2002-08-17 || Loss ||align=left| Grégory Tony || K-1 World Grand Prix 2002 in Las Vegas, Quarter Final || Las Vegas, Nevada, USA || KO || 1 || 2:48
|-
|-  bgcolor="#CCFFCC"
| 2002-04-20 || Win ||align=left| Peter Varga || K-1 World Grand Prix 2002 Preliminary Italy, Final || Milan, Italy || KO || 2 || 2:45 
|-
! style=background:white colspan=9 |
|-
|-  bgcolor="#CCFFCC"
| 2002-04-20 || Win ||align=left| Gabor Meizster || K-1 World Grand Prix 2002 Preliminary Italy, Semi Final || Milan, Italy || KO || 2 || 2:33
|-
|-  bgcolor="#CCFFCC"
| 2002-04-20 || Win ||align=left| Souleiman || K-1 World Grand Prix 2002 Preliminary Italy, Quarter Final || Milan, Italy || KO || 1 || 2:02
|-
|-
| colspan=9 | Legend:

Lethwei record 

|- style="background:#c5d2ea;"
| 2019-04-12 || Draw || align="left" | Samuel Krištofič || XFN Promotions || Bratislava, Slovakia || Draw || 5 || 3:00
|-
| colspan=9 | Legend:

See also
List of K-1 events
List of K-1 champions
List of male kickboxers

References

External links 
 Profile of Petr Vondráček
 Vondráček's Profile

1977 births
Living people
Heavyweight kickboxers
Czech male kickboxers
SUPERKOMBAT kickboxers
People from Děčín District
Sportspeople from the Ústí nad Labem Region